Darcy Henry (1932–2004) was an Australian rugby league footballer who played in the 1950s.

Playing career
Henry was from Tamworth, New South Wales, and came to Eastern Suburbs as a teenager in 1951. After the 1952 season, Henry moved to play with both Temora and Forbes and represented New South Wales and Australia in 1955 & 1956.

Henry returned to Sydney in 1956 to play with Western Suburbs and played four seasons with them including the 1958 Grand Final. Henry is listed on the Australian Players Register as Kangaroo No. 314.

Death
Henry died on 27 November 2004 at Manly, New South Wales, aged 72.

References

1933 births
2004 deaths
Western Suburbs Magpies players
Sydney Roosters players
New South Wales rugby league team players
City New South Wales rugby league team players
Country New South Wales rugby league team players
Australia national rugby league team players
Australian rugby league players
Rugby league centres
Rugby league wingers
People from Tamworth, New South Wales
Rugby league players from New South Wales